Dunbar Head is a projecting rock headland at the south end of the Scott Coast,  southeast of the summit of Mount Morning. It was named by the Advisory Committee on Antarctic Names (1999) after Nelia W. Dunbar, Department of Geoscience, New Mexico Institute of Mining and Technology, Socorro, who made geological investigations at nearby Mount Erebus, the Allan Hills, Mount Takahe, and the Crary Mountains.

References 

Headlands of the Ross Dependency
Hillary Coast